Herman Bouber, born Hermanus Blom (24 September 1885, Amsterdam – 2 February 1963, Amsterdam) was a Dutch actor, screenwriter and playwright. He was married to the actress Aaf Bouber.

Filmography
Actor
 Bleeke Bet (1923) - Sally Matteman
 Oranje Hein (1925)
 Waar een Wil Is, Is een Weg! (1931)
 Oranje Hein (1936) - Oranje Hein
 The Trouble With Money (1936) - Brand
 The Three Wishes (1937) - Campagni, Chef van de Claque
 Vadertje Langbeen (1938)
 Boefje (1939)
 Sterren stralen overal (1953)
 The Village on the River (1958) - Nardje

Screenwriter
 The Bluejackets (1922)
 Oranje Hein (1925)
 De Vier Mullers (1934)
 Bleeke Bet (1934)
 De Big van het Regiment (1939)

Bibliography
 Giddins, Gary. Natural Selection: Gary Giddins on Comedy, Film, Music, And Books. Oxford University Press, 2006.
 Mathijs, Ernest. The Cinema of the Low Countries. Wallflower Press, 2004.

External links

1885 births
1963 deaths
Dutch male film actors
Dutch male silent film actors
Dutch screenwriters
Dutch male screenwriters
Dutch male writers
Male actors from Amsterdam
20th-century screenwriters